The 8"/30 caliber gun (spoken "eight-inch-thirty-caliber") formed the main batteries of the United States Navy's "New Navy".

Mark 1
Mark 1, Nos. 1–4, Mod 0, consisted of a tube, jacket, 19 hoops and an elevating band with integral trunnions. The Mod 1 had no trunnions and were not hooped to the muzzle.

Mark 2

The Mark 2 Mod 1, Nos. 5–8, was similar, but had the hoops differently arranged, did not have integral trunnions and had its rear sights controlled by worm and miter gears.

Naval Service

On display

Two guns from the cruiser  are currently (2010) on display at Hamlin Park in Shoreline, Washington. A plaque at the site states that one of these guns fired the first shot at the Battle of Manila Bay on 1 May 1898. Another plaque states
              8-inch 30 Caliber Gun
                  U.S.S. Boston
    Captain Frank Wildes, U.S. Navy Commanding
             This gun is credited at
            THE BATTLE OF MANILA BAY
          with dismounting three guns
                   in the
            Spanish fort at Cavite
                 May 1, 1898
 The two guns from Boston are marked "U. S. NAVY 8in MARK II 1899 CONVERTED".

Notes

References

Books
 
Online sources

External links
 
 
 
 Bluejackets Manual, 1917, 4th revision: US Navy 14-inch Mark 1 gun

Naval guns of the United States
203 mm artillery